Bhai Jagtap (birth name Ashok Arjunrao Jagtap) is an Indian politician and member of the Indian National Congress from Mumbai Maharashtra. He is a two term Maharashtra Legislative Council (MLC) and a one term Maharashtra Legislative Assembly (MLA). He currently serves as the President of the Mumbai Regional Congress Committee.

Political career 
Jagtap started his political career as a trade union leader. His Bharatiya Kamgar Karmachari Mahasangh was a success story among trade unions. In 2001 he joined the Indian National Congress and stood for assembly  election in the 2004 election in which he won the Khetwadi constituency.

Personal life 

Jagtap is married to Tejaswaniben Jagtap with whom they have two daughters. He comes from a small village Mandangad taluka, Ratnagiri district, and moved to Mumbai to pursue higher education and got active in student politics through National Students' Union of India.

References 

Indian National Congress politicians from Maharashtra
Indian Hindus
Living people
Members of the Maharashtra Legislative Council
Politicians from Mumbai
Year of birth missing (living people)
Place of birth missing (living people)
Marathi politicians